Taleqani (also Romanized as Ţāleqānī; also known as Rūstā-ye Ţāleqānī) is a village in Chamzey Rural District, in the Central District of Malekshahi County, Ilam Province, Iran. At the 2006 census, its population was 118, in 26 families. The village is populated by Kurds.

References 

Populated places in Malekshahi County
Kurdish settlements in Ilam Province